Leptolalax pallidus is a species of frogs in the family Megophryidae.

References

pallidus
Amphibians described in 2016